The Beast Inside is the second studio album from British indie rock band Inspiral Carpets. It was released on 22 April 1991 on Mute Records.

The album made the Top 10 in the United Kingdom.

Critical reception
The Rolling Stone Album Guide called the album "a leap forward," writing that "Sleep Well Tonight" "recalled the Velvets at their most Teutonically romantic." Trouser Press called it "a misbegotten attempt at formula- tinkering that broadens the band’s dynamic net but doesn’t pull anything worthwhile in." The Los Angeles Times wrote that The Beast Inside "bears plenty of beat-heavy ecstasy, as well as sounds o’ the ‘60s (notably Clint Boon’s swirling organ)." The Chicago Tribune wrote that "few of the tunes are immediate powerhouses, but as the Carpets maintain their garage-rock energy while keeping the soundscapes changing ... they provide their eventual, if minor, rewards."

Track listing

LP: Cow Records / DUNG 14 (UK) 

 "Caravan" (4:17)
 "Please Be Cruel" (3:38)
 "Born Yesterday" (5:23)
 "Sleep Well Tonight" (5:10)
 "Grip" (3:16)
 "Beast Inside" (5:09)
 "Niagara" (7:10)
 "Mermaid" (4:29)
 "Further Away" (13:38)
 "Dreams Are All We Have" (4:01)

 also released on CD (DUNG 14 CD) and MC (DUNG 14 MC)

Personnel 
Clint Boon - keyboards, backing vocals
Craig Gill - drums
Tom Hingley - lead vocals
Graham Lambert - guitars
Martyn Walsh - bass

Charts

References

1991 albums
Inspiral Carpets albums
Mute Records albums